Boussy may refer to:
 Poussi (born 1953), Egyptian actress
 Boussy, Haute-Savoie, a commune in Haute-Savoie, France